Nick Meyer (born 1981) is an American photographer, living in Western Massachusetts.

Life and work
Meyer received a BFA from Massachusetts College of Art and Design in Boston in 2005, and an MFA from California College of the Arts in Oakland in 2008.

His book The Local was made in his home town of Greenfield, Massachusetts in New England and highlights issues with addiction, housing insecurity and small-town decline in America.

Publications
Pattern Language. Brick, 2010. . With an introduction by Melissa Febos.
Either Limits or Contradictions. Daylight, 2016. . With a foreword by Aaron Schuman and contributions by Lawrence Ferlinghetti.
The Common. 2018. Zine. Edition of 500 copies.
Good Bones. 2020.
Obvious Children. 2020. Edition of 50 copies.
The Local. London: Mack, 2021. .

References

External links

Photographers from Massachusetts
Living people
1981 births